Super Typhoon Nancy, also known as the , was an extremely powerful tropical cyclone of the 1961 Pacific typhoon season and one of the most intense tropical cyclones on record. The system possibly had the strongest winds ever measured in a tropical cyclone, with 345 km/h (215 mph) winds, tied with Hurricane Patricia of 2015. Nancy caused extensive damage, as well as at least 202 deaths and nearly 5,000 injuries in Japan and elsewhere, in September 1961.

Meteorological history

A tropical depression formed from a low-pressure area near Kwajalein Atoll on September 7. It strengthened rapidly; by the time position fixes could be taken, Nancy was nearly a super typhoon, on September 8. Moving gradually westward, Nancy explosively deepened and reached wind speeds equivalent to a Category 5 super typhoon (Saffir–Simpson Hurricane Scale) on September 9. It would maintain that intensity for the next several days.

Shortly after reaching peak intensity, Nancy approached the Ryūkyū Islands and began turning. It passed near Okinawa and over Haze. The ridge steering Nancy broke down, and the typhoon turned sharply and headed towards Japan. Nancy made landfall as a strong typhoon on September 16 as it passed directly over Muroto Zaki. Nancy made a second landfall on Honshū near Osaka. The typhoon rapidly traveled up the length of the island as it continued accelerating, eventually reaching a forward speed of 65 mph (100 km/h, 55 knots). The typhoon quickly crossed over Hokkaidō before entering the Sea of Okhotsk as a tropical storm. Nancy went extratropical on September 17. The extratropical system eventually crossed over Kamchatka and entered the open ocean.

Impact

Although no monetary value of all damage is known, damage was "phenomenal" in all areas where Nancy hit. There were at least 194 deaths and 8 people unaccounted for, according to Japanese government official confirmation.

Guam
On Guam, over half of all crops were destroyed by heavy winds and rain. A total of $40,000 (1961 USD) worth of damage was done to roads on the island. Most of the damage was on the southern end of the island. No deaths were reported on Guam.

Japan
In Japan, according to Japan Fire and Disaster Management Agency official confirmed report, 194 people were killed, 8 were missing, and 4,972 people were injured. These totals made Nancy the sixth-deadliest typhoon to hit Japan at the time. Timely warnings and adequate preparations were probably responsible for the relatively low death toll. The damage was "small" relative to other typhoons that impacted densely populated areas of Japan.

Hundreds of thousands of people had their lives disrupted. Super Typhoon Nancy destroyed 11,539 houses, damaged 32,604 homes, and flooded 280,078 others. Although the exact number may never be known, the Stars and Stripes reported in late September 1961 that over 1,056 ships and fishing vessels were sunk or blown ashore, and that many more were damaged.

Floodwaters washed away 566 bridges and caused 1146 landslides. Roads were destroyed at a total of 2,053 locations. Damages in Osaka amounted to $500 million (1961 USD).

On Okinawa, low-lying areas experienced heavy flooding, which did significant damage to agriculture and structures. On Amami-o-Shima, one person was missing and another was badly injured. A ship was sunk. Extensive flooding of crops and houses left 152 people homeless.

Due to Nancy's damage and death toll, the Japan Meteorological Agency named Nancy the "Second Muroto Typhoon". Nancy is one of only ten typhoons to receive special names in Japan.

Records

A reconnaissance aircraft flying into the typhoon near its peak intensity on September 12 determined Nancy's one-minute sustained winds to be 185 knots (215 mph; 345 km/h). If these values are reliable, they would be the highest wind speeds ever measured in a tropical cyclone. However, it was later determined that measurements and estimations of wind speeds from the 1940s to 1960s were excessive. Thus, Nancy's winds may actually be lower than its official best-track value. In 2016, reanalysis of Hurricane Patricia noted that the storm had the same sustained winds as Nancy, the highest on record in the Western Hemisphere.

Although the Saffir–Simpson hurricane wind scale (SSHWS) did not exist at the time, Nancy would have been a Category 5 equivalent for a total of five and a half days (or 132 hours), assuming the wind speed data are reliable. If so, this is the record for the Northern Hemisphere and more than a day longer than the runner-up system, 1962's Typhoon Karen.

See also

List of tropical cyclone records
 Other storms of the same name
 1934 Muroto typhoon - The most intense landfalling typhoon in Japanese history, with a peak low pressure of 
 Typhoon Vera (1959) - The strongest storm to ever impact Japan, with maximum sustained wind speeds of 160 mph (260 km/h) upon landfall - Comparable to a Category 5-equivalent super typhoon
 Typhoon Mireille (1991) - Similar track, also very costly and destructive upon landfall
 Typhoon Neoguri (2014) - Similar track, though much weaker on landfall
 Hurricane Patricia (2015) - Ties Typhoon Nancy for one-minute maximum sustained winds of 215 mph (345 km/h).
 Typhoon Jebi (2018) - Similar track, also caused massive damage in Japan
 Typhoon Hagibis (2019) - Another deadly and extremely destructive storm that became the costliest typhoon on record

References

External links

 JMA General Information of Typhoon Nancy (6118) from Digital Typhoon
 JTWC Report of Typhoon Nancy
 Storm Path of Typhoon Nancy

1961 Pacific typhoon season
Typhoons in Guam
Typhoons in Japan
Typhoon Nancy
Typhoons